WKPB (89.5 FM) is a radio station licensed to Henderson, Kentucky. The station is owned by Western Kentucky University, and is an affiliate of the WKU Public Radio network.

History of call letters
The call letters WKPB were earlier assigned to an FM station in Knoxville, Tennessee. Owned by the Knoxville Publishing Company (The Knoxville Journal newspaper), it began broadcasting October 15, 1947, on 93.3 MHz. This station ceased operations 18 months later, on April 15, 1949, with the Journal citing the uncertainty created by the advent of television. The newspaper sold its equipment to the University of Tennessee at Knoxville (which started WUOT using it that fall) and its records to the general public.

References

External links
 wkyufm.org
 

KPB
NPR member stations
Western Kentucky University
Henderson, Kentucky
College radio stations in Kentucky
1989 establishments in Kentucky
Radio stations established in 1989